Passion is a 1997 album by Lady Saw.

Track listing
 "Stone Love - Introlude / Gal No Worry"
 "Love Is Strange" (featuring Shaggy)
 "Gal No Worry"
 "The Work"
 "Na Nurse"
 "Healing" (with Beenie Man)
 "I Don't Need To Know"
 "Lover Boy"
 "Wuk With You"  
 "Sycamore Tree"  
 "Call Me"
 "Long Till It Bend" (featuring Merciless)
 "Let Peace Reign"
 "Passion"
 "Woman Mi Name"

Charts

1997 albums
Lady Saw albums